Vojtěch Schulmeister (born 9 September 1983 in Olomouc) is a Czech former footballer who played as a striker.

Career 
Schulmeister played in the Czech First League with his hometown club, Sigma Olomouc.

Schulmeister joined Dutch side Heracles Almelo in the summer of 2008, alongside former Sigma-teammate Lukáš Bajer. Schulmeister impressed enough to stay with Heracles, while Bajer was forced to return to Sigma.

References

External links 
 
 
 

Czech footballers
Czech Republic youth international footballers
Czech Republic under-21 international footballers
SK Sigma Olomouc players
FK Chmel Blšany players
Heracles Almelo players
FC Nitra players
Almere City FC players
AGOVV Apeldoorn players
Bruk-Bet Termalica Nieciecza players
Czech First League players
Eredivisie players
Slovak Super Liga players
Eerste Divisie players
Czech expatriate footballers
Expatriate footballers in the Netherlands
Czech expatriate sportspeople in the Netherlands
Expatriate footballers in Slovakia
Czech expatriate sportspeople in Slovakia
Expatriate footballers in Poland
Czech expatriate sportspeople in Poland
Sportspeople from Olomouc
1983 births
Living people
Association football forwards